The 2004 Patriot League men's basketball tournament was played at The Show Place Arena in Upper Marlboro, Maryland and Stabler Arena in Bethlehem, Pennsylvania after the conclusion of the 2003–04 regular season. Top seed  defeated #2 seed , 59–57 in the championship game, to win its first Patriot League Tournament title. The Mountain Hawks earned an automatic bid to the 2004 NCAA tournament as one of two #16 seeds in the St. Louis region.  defeated Lehigh in an opening round game in Dayton, Ohio.

Format
All eight league members participated in the tournament, with teams seeded according to regular season conference record.

Bracket

* denotes overtime period

References

Tournament
Patriot League men's basketball tournament
Patriot League men's basketball tournament
Patriot League men's basketball tournament
Patriot League men's basketball tournament